The cherimoya (Annona cherimola), also spelled chirimoya and called chirimuya by the Inca people, is a species of edible fruit-bearing plant in the genus Annona, from the family Annonaceae, which includes the closely related sweetsop and soursop. The plant has long been believed to be native to Ecuador and Peru, with cultivation practiced in the Andes and Central America, although a recent hypothesis postulates Central America as the origin instead, because many of the plant's wild relatives occur in this area.

Cherimoya is grown in tropical and subtropical regions throughout the world including Central America, northern South America, Southern California, South Asia, Australia, the Mediterranean region, and North Africa. American writer Mark Twain called the cherimoya "the most delicious fruit known to men". The creamy texture of the flesh gives the fruit its secondary name, the custard apple.

Etymology
The name is derived from the Quechua word chirimuya, which means "cold seeds". The plant grows at high altitudes, where the weather is colder, and the seeds will germinate at higher altitudes. In Bolivia, Chile, Colombia, Ecuador, Peru, and Venezuela, the fruit is commonly known as chirimoya (spelled according to the rules of the Spanish language).

Description
Annona cherimola is a fairly dense, fast-growing, woody, 
briefly deciduous 
but mostly evergreen, low-branched, spreading tree 

Mature branches are sappy and woody. Young branches and twigs have a matting of short, fine, rust-colored hairs. When young, they are covered with soft, fine, tangled, rust-colored hairs. When mature, the leaves bear hairs only along the veins on the undersurface. The tops are hairless and a dull medium green with paler veins, the backs are velvety, dull grey-green with raised pale green veins. New leaves are whitish below.

Leaves are single and alternate, dark green, and slightly hairy on the top surface.

Cherimoya trees bear very pale green, fleshy flowers. Each flower has three outer, greenish, fleshy, oblong, downy petals and three smaller, pinkish inner petals with yellow or brown, finely matted hairs outside, whitish with purple spots and many stamens on the inside. The pollen is shed as permanent tetrads.

Fruits

They ripen to brown with a fissured surface in late winter and early spring; they weigh on the average , but extra-large specimens may weigh  or more.

Cherimoya fruits are commercially classified according to degree of surface irregularity, as follows: 'Lisa', almost smooth, difficult to discern areoles; 'Impresa', with "fingerprint" depressions; 'Umbonata', with rounded protrusions at the apex of each areole; 'Mamilata' with fleshy, nipple-like protrusions; or 'Tuberculata', with conical protrusions having wart-like tips.

Cherimoya seeds are poisonous if crushed open. Like other members of the family Annonaceae, the entire plant contains small amounts of neurotoxic acetogenins, such as annonacin, which appear to be linked to atypical parkinsonism in Guadeloupe. Moreover, an extract of the bark can induce paralysis if injected.

Distribution and habitat

From there it was taken by Europeans to various parts of the tropics. Unlike other Annona species, A. cherimola has not successfully naturalized in West Africa, and Annona glabra is often misidentified as this species in Australasia.

Native
Neotropic:
Western South America: Ecuador, Peru
Southern South America: Chile
Current (naturalized and native)
Neotropic:
Caribbean: Florida, Cuba, Dominican Republic, Haiti, Jamaica, Puerto Rico
Central America: Belize, Costa Rica, El Salvador, Guatemala, Honduras, Nicaragua, Panama
Northern South America: Guyana, Venezuela
Southern North America: Mexico
Western South America: Bolivia, Colombia, Ecuador, Peru
Southern South America: Chile, Brazil
Palearctic: Algeria, Egypt, Libya, France, Italy, Spain, Madeira, Azores
Afrotropic: Eritrea, Somalia, Tanzania,
Indomalaya: India, Singapore, Thailand
Australia

A. cherimola is not native to Chile. When it was introduced is unknown, but it happened likely in pre-Hispanic times. Traditionally, it has been cultivated in the valleys and oases of the north, as far south as the valley of Aconcagua.

Ecology

Pollination

The flowers of A. cherimola are hermaphroditic and have a mechanism to avoid self-pollination. The short-lived flowers open as female, then progress to a later, male stage in a matter of hours. This requires a separate pollinator that not only can collect the pollen from flowers in the male stage, but also deposit it in flowers in the female stage. Studies of which insect(s) serve as the natural pollinator in the cherimoya's native region have been inconclusive; some form of beetle is suspected.

Quite often, the female flower is receptive in the early part of the first day, but pollen is not produced in the male stage until the late afternoon of the second day. Honey bees are not good pollinators of this plant, for example, because their bodies are too large to fit between the fleshy petals of the female flower. Female flowers have the petals only partially separated, and the petals separate widely when they become male flowers. So, the bees pick up pollen from the male flowers, but are unable to transfer this pollen to the female flowers. The small beetles which are suspected to pollinate cherimoya in its land of origin must therefore be much smaller than bees.

For fruit production outside the cherimoya's native region, cultivators must either rely upon the wind to spread pollen in dense orchards or else use hand pollination. Pollinating by hand requires a paint brush. Briefly, to increase fruit production, growers collect the pollen from the male plants with the brush, and then transfer it to the female flowers immediately or store it in the refrigerator overnight. Cherimoya pollen has a short life, but it can be extended with refrigeration.

Climate requirements

In Western horticulture, growers are often advised to grow cherimoya in full sun, while the plant has been considered shade-tolerant in Japan. In 2001, a study conducted by Kyoto University showed shading of 50–70% sunlight was adequate to obtain an optimal light environment.

Cultivation

Cultivars

The cherimoya of the Granada-Málaga tropical coast in Spain is a fruit of the cultivar 'Fino de Jete' with the EU's protected designation of origin appellation. 'Fino de Jete' fruits have skin type Impressa and are smooth or slightly concave at the edges. The fruit is round, oval, heart-shaped, or kidney-shaped. The seeds are enclosed in the carpels and so do not detach easily. The flavor balances intense sweetness with slight acidity and the soluble sugar content exceeds 17° Bx. This variety is prepared and packed in the geographical area because "it is a very delicate perishable fruit and its skin is very susceptible to browning caused by mechanical damage, such as rubbing, knocks, etc. The fruit must be handled with extreme care, from picking by hand in the field to packing in the warehouse, which must be carried out within 24 hours. Repacking or further handling is strictly forbidden."

Annona cherimola, preferring the cool Andean altitudes, readily hybridizes with other Annona species. A hybrid with A. squamosa called atemoya has received some attention in West Africa, Australia, Brazil, and Florida.

Propagation
Though sensitive to frost, it must have periods of cool temperatures or the tree will gradually go dormant. The indigenous inhabitants of the Andes say the cherimoya cannot tolerate snow.

In the Mediterranean region, it is cultivated mainly in southern Spain and Portugal, where it was introduced between 1751 and 1797, after which it was carried to Italy, but now can also be found in several countries of Africa, the Middle East, and Oceania. It is cultivated throughout the Americas, including Hawaii since 1790 and California, where it was introduced in 1871.

Harvest
Large fruits which are uniformly green, without cracks or mostly browned skin, are best. Unripe cherimoyas will ripen at room temperature, when they will yield to gentle pressure. Ethylene removal can also be helpful in slowing the ripening of mature green fruits.

Nutritional profile
Raw cherimoya fruit is 79% water, 18% carbohydrate, 2% protein, and 1% fat (table). In a 100-gram reference amount providing 75 calories, cherimoya is a rich source (20% or more of the Daily Value, DV) of vitamin B6 and a moderate source (10–19% DV) of vitamin C, dietary fiber, and riboflavin (table).

Eating quality
"The pineapple, the mangosteen, and the cherimoya", wrote the botanist Berthold Carl Seemann, "are considered the finest fruits in the world, and I have tasted them in those localities where they are supposed to attain their highest perfection – the pineapple in Guayaquil, the mangosteen in the Indian Archipelago, and the cherimoya on the slopes of the Andes, and if I were asked which would be the best fruit, I would choose without hesitation, cherimoya. Its taste, indeed, surpasses that of every other fruit, and Haenke was quite right when he called it the masterpiece of Nature."

Different varieties have different flavors, textures, and shapes. The flavor of the flesh ranges from mellow sweet to tangy or acidic sweet, with variable suggestions of pineapple, banana, pear, papaya, strawberry or other berry, and apple, depending on the variety. The ripened flesh is creamy white. When ripe, the skin is green and gives slightly to pressure. Some characterize the fruit flavor as a blend of banana, pineapple, papaya, peach, and strawberry. The fruit can be chilled and eaten with a spoon, which has earned it another nickname, the "ice cream fruit". In Chile and Peru, it is commonly used in ice creams and yogurt.

When the fruit is ripe and still has the fresh, fully mature green-yellow skin color, the texture is like that of a soft-ripe pear and papaya. When the skin turns brown at room temperature, the fruit is no longer good for human consumption.

Culture
The Moche culture of Peru had a fascination with agriculture and represented fruits and vegetables in their art; cherimoyas were often depicted in their ceramics.

Gallery

See also
 List of cherimoya cultivars
 Atemoya (a cross of A. squamosa and A. cherimola)
 Pawpaw (Asimina spp.)
 Soursop (Annona muricata)
 Sugar-apple (Annona squamosa)
 White sapote (Casimiroa edulis)  sometimes mislabeled as cherimoya
 Wild soursop (Annona senegalensis)
 Wild sweetsop (Annona reticulata)

References

External links

 California Rare Fruit Growers article on cherimoya 

Edible fruits
Tropical fruit
cherimola
Flora of the Andes
Crops originating from the Americas
Crops originating from Chile
Crops originating from Peru
Crops originating from Ecuador
Flora of Peru
Flora of Ecuador
Flora of Colombia
Flora of Chile
Flora of Bolivia
Flora of Argentina
Garden plants of South America
Taxa named by Philip Miller